Copelatus uludanuensis is a species of diving beetle. It is part of the subfamily Copelatinae in the family Dytiscidae. It was described by Hendrich & Balke in 1995.

References

uludanuensis
Beetles described in 1995